Joseph Krol (August 13, 1915 – October 26, 1993) was a Canadian ice hockey left winger who played 26 games in the National Hockey League with the New York Rangers and Brooklyn Americans in the late 1930s, and early 1940s. The rest of his career, which lasted from 1935 to 1942, was mainly spent in the minor International American Hockey League/American Hockey League. He was born in Winnipeg, Manitoba.

Career statistics

Regular season and playoffs

Awards and achievements
EAHL First All-Star Team (1936)

External links

1915 births
1993 deaths
Brooklyn Americans players
Canadian expatriate ice hockey players in the United States
Canadian ice hockey left wingers
Hershey Bears players
New York Rangers players
New York Rovers players
Philadelphia Ramblers players
Ice hockey people from Winnipeg
Springfield Indians players
Winnipeg Monarchs players